NCCN may refer to:

 National Competitiveness Council of Nigeria
 National Comprehensive Cancer Network
 NCCN, the molecular formula of cyanogen